Glenys Ann Beauchamp  is a senior Australian public servant. She was a departmental secretary between 2010 and 2020, across multiple departments and portfolios.

Life and career
Beauchamp was awarded a Bachelor of Economics from the Australian National University in 1977.

Beauchamp began her Australian Public Service career as a Graduate in the Industry Commission, an agency that existed between 1990 and 1998 and was responsible for holding public inquiries and reporting on matters referred by the Government; and reporting annually on the economic performance of industry, and the effects of assistance and regulation on industry and the economy.

Before 2006, Beauchamp held a number of positions in the ACT Public Service, including Deputy Chief Executive, Department of Disability, Housing and Community Services and Deputy CEO, Department of Health.

Beauchamp rejoined the Australian Public Service in 2002, in the Department of Family and Community Services.

In January 2006, Beauchamp was appointed a Deputy Secretary in the Department of Families, Community Services and Indigenous Affairs.

Between February and August 2009, Beauchamp was responsible for coordinating a whole of government response to the Victorian bushfires, chairing the Commonwealth Victorian Bushfire Inter-Departmental Committee.

In December 2010, then Prime Minister Julia Gillard appointed Beauchamp to the position of Secretary of the Department of Regional Australia, Regional Development and Local Government, after Beauchamp had been acting in the position since the Department was established in September 2010. In February 2011, the Australian Government nominated Beauchamp to the board of the Queensland Reconstruction Authority.

In February 2020 before retiring, Beauchamp destroyed her notebooks that contained meeting notes relating to the Sports rorts affair (2020). This action was performed prior to a senate inquiry hearing where she would have been required to provide evidence of the scandal, leaving many Australians baffled.

Awards
Beauchamp was awarded a Public Service Medal in June 2010 for outstanding public service in coordinating the Australian Government's response to the 2009 Victorian bushfires. She was appointed an Officer of the Order of Australia in the 2023 Australia Day Honours.

References

Living people
Year of birth missing (living people)
Officers of the Order of Australia
Place of birth missing (living people)
Secretaries of the Australian Government Health Department
Recipients of the Public Service Medal (Australia)
Australian National University alumni
University of Canberra alumni